Mikko-Sakari Koivu (born 12 March 1983) is a Finnish former professional ice hockey player. Koivu was drafted sixth overall in the 2001 NHL Entry Draft by the Minnesota Wild. After four seasons with TPS in the SM-liiga, Koivu joined the Wild in 2005. He spent fifteen seasons in Minnesota, including eleven as captain, accumulating several franchise records, including games played, assists and points scored. Koivu retired in 2021, after a short stint with the Columbus Blue Jackets.

Internationally, Koivu served as captain of the gold medal-winning Finnish national team at the 2011 World Championship.

Playing career
After playing in the Finnish junior leagues, Koivu began playing for TPS of the SM-liiga as a 17-year-old in the 2000–01 season, the same team for which older brother Saku also once played. He was selected sixth overall in the 2001 NHL Entry Draft by the Minnesota Wild and continued to play with TPS for three more seasons.

Minnesota Wild
Koivu moved to North America in the 2004–05 to play for Minnesota's American Hockey League (AHL) affiliate, the Houston Aeros, while that NHL season was canceled. The next season, he made his NHL debut with the Wild, scoring 21 points in his rookie season. He signed a one-year contract with the Wild on 18 July 2006.

In 2006–07, Koivu improved to a career-high 20 goals, 34 assists and 54 points. Injuries slowed him down in his third season, however; in a game against the Vancouver Canucks, defenceman Mattias Öhlund retaliated to an unpenalized elbow from Koivu and slashed him, breaking a bone in Koivu's leg. Öhlund was given a four-game suspension and Koivu missed 24 games as a result of the injury.

On 30 June 2007, the Wild re-signed Koivu to a four-year, $13 million contract worth $3.25 million annually.

Before the 2008–09 season commenced, Koivu was announced as a permanent alternate captain for the entire season, along with teammate Andrew Brunette, assuming they were not captain for the month (the Wild captaincy was rotated among the players on a monthly basis, each season). But Koivu started the 2008–09 season as team captain for the months of October and November. Though rumors swirled that then-Wild Head Coach Jacques Lemaire was close to ending the captain rotation and naming Koivu the permanent captain, he was replaced by Kim Johnsson in December, reverting to his role as alternate captain. In January 2009, Koivu was once again honoured with the Wild captaincy after only a month's hiatus.

On 16 October 2008, Koivu tied a Wild franchise record for most assists in a game with four against the Florida Panthers. He also added a goal for a career-high five-point game as the Wild defeated Florida 6–2. In July 2009, it was announced that Koivu would be on the cover of Finland's version of EA Sports' video game NHL 10. He was also voted the best Finn in the League by NHL.com.

Koivu was named the first permanent captain in Wild franchise history on 20 October 2009. During the ensuing off-season, he signed a then-franchise-record seven-year, $47 million contract extension on 16 July 2010, which went into effect during the 2011–12 season.

On 12 January 2012, Koivu was selected to his first NHL All-Star Game. However, he was unable to participate due to injury and was replaced by Oilers forward Jordan Eberle.

On 18 March 2014, Koivu recorded three points in a 6–0 win over the New York Islanders, in the process becoming the Wild's all-time leading scorer with 438 points in 588 games.

On 28 February 2016, Koivu surpassed Nick Schultz's 743 games played with the Minnesota Wild to own this franchise record as well.

On 18 September 2017, the Wild signed Koivu to a two-year, $11 million contract extension worth $5.5 million annually.

On 6 February 2019, Koivu was ruled out for the remainder of the 2018–19 season after suffering a tear in his Anterior cruciate ligament (ACL) and meniscus in his right knee. The incident occurred the night before in a game against the Buffalo Sabres. He ended his season with eight goals and 29 points in 48 games.

The Wild  retired Koivu's number 9 on March 13, 2022, becoming the first player in franchise history to receive that honor.

Columbus Blue Jackets and retirement
On 10 October 2020, Koivu ended his 15-year tenure with the Wild and signed as a free agent to a one-year, $1.5 million contract with the Columbus Blue Jackets. On 9 February 2021, after only posting a goal and an assist for 2 points in 7 games, Koivu announced his retirement from the NHL.

International play

As a junior, Koivu competed in two World Junior U18 Championships, capturing gold in 2000 and bronze in 2001. Koivu did double duty in 2001, also participating in the World Junior Championships, earning a silver medal while contributing three assists.

He played in his second World Junior Championship the following year in 2002, tallying five points in six games as Finland captured another silver medal. It also marked Koivu's fourth and final medal in junior international play. These junior years also marked the start for Koivu's long-time collaboration in the national team with Tuomo Ruutu, with whom he has been often paired as an effective playmaker-scorer duo ever since, in similar manner as his older brother Saku usually found himself with Teemu Selänne.

Before making his North American debut in the AHL, Koivu competed in the 2004 World Cup as Finland finished runner-up to Canada. Two years later, he appeared in the 2006 Winter Olympics in Turin. Koivu failed to register a point as Finland finished with a silver medal.

Beginning in 2006, Koivu appeared in three consecutive World Championships. He helped Finland to a bronze medal in 2006 with four points, then matched his output the following year with another four points in 2007 as Finland improved to a silver medal. In the 2008 World Championships, Koivu became a key contributor, tallying an international career-high nine points in nine games as Finland won the bronze medal. He was asked to join the team in 2009, and again in 2010, but he had to decline both times due to injuries.

Koivu was part of the team that won the bronze medal at the 2010 Winter Olympics in Vancouver, British Columbia, Canada. In 2011, Koivu was able to accept the invitation and led Finland, as the captain of the team, to its second gold medal at World Championships.

Koivu was also selected to represent Finland at the 2014 Winter Olympics in Sochi, but was forced to withdraw from the squad due to an injury sustained in the NHL.

Koivu was again named team captain of Finland for the 2016 World Cup of Hockey competition in Toronto. He was the only Finnish player to return to the tournament after playing in the 2004 edition.

Personal life
Koivu's older brother is Saku Koivu, the longtime captain of the Montreal Canadiens and alternate captain for the Anaheim Ducks before his retirement in 2014. Their father is Jukka Koivu, the former head coach of TPS, for which both Saku and Mikko have played. A number of Koivu's friends include Tuomo Ruutu of the New Jersey Devils and Koivu's former Minnesota teammate, Kurtis Foster.
Mikko, his brother Saku and Miikka Kiprusoff along with former Supercell owners Ilkka Paananen and Mikko Kodisoja are all minority owners of HC TPS Turku Oy, the company which operates TPS Turku hockey team.

Koivu spends summers with his family and friends in his hometown of Turku, Finland. He owns a suite in the Xcel Energy Center, which he shares with former teammates Niklas Bäckström and Nick Schultz, called M&N's Suite 4 Kids, and the group donates it to children with serious medical conditions. Koivu served in the Finnish Army during the summer of 2011 as a conscript. On 14 October 2011, Koivu donated two rooms to the Minnesota Children's Hospital epilepsy and neurological unit.

Koivu married Helena Koivu (née Kipper) in the summer of 2014. They have one daughter and two sons together. The pair divorced in 2020.

Records and awards
 Won the Finnish Championship (Kanada-malja) in 2000–01 SM-liiga season
 Won silver in 2003–04 SM-liiga season
 SM-Liiga regular season victory (Harry Lindblad Memorial Trophy): 2003-04
 Minnesota Wild franchise record for most assists in a game (tied): 4 (16 October 2008, against the Florida Panthers and again on 2 January 2011, against the Phoenix Coyotes).
 First ever permanent captain for the Minnesota Wild (20 October 2009).
 Selected to play in 2012 NHL All-Star Game, but unable to play due to injury.
 Gold Medal at IIHF World Championship 2011 (as captain of Team Finland).
 Minnesota Wild all-time franchise power-play points leader (as of 5 October 2015)
 Minnesota Wild all-time franchise points leader (709 as of 10 October 2020)
 Minnesota Wild all-time franchise games played leader (1,028 as of 10 October 2020)
 Named Selke Trophy Finalist (2016-17 season)
 First player in Minnesota Wild franchise history to play 1,000 NHL games and with the same team (as of 1 December 2019).
 First player to have number retired in Wild history

Career statistics

Regular season and playoffs

International

See also
Notable families in the NHL
List of Olympic medalist families

References

External links
 

1983 births
Living people
Columbus Blue Jackets players
Finnish ice hockey centres
HC TPS players
Ice hockey players at the 2006 Winter Olympics
Ice hockey players at the 2010 Winter Olympics
Medalists at the 2006 Winter Olympics
Medalists at the 2010 Winter Olympics
Minnesota Wild draft picks
Minnesota Wild players
National Hockey League first-round draft picks
Olympic bronze medalists for Finland
Olympic ice hockey players of Finland
Olympic medalists in ice hockey
Olympic silver medalists for Finland
Sportspeople from Turku